Toonimo is a web-based solution that offers on-site user assistance via online walkthroughs.

Company Overview

Toonimo is a cloud-based digital walkthrough platform that helps guide users through website funnels. Toonimo works by overlaying human voice audio and graphical coachmarks on web pages to guide or orient web users. Other features include an analytics dashboard, A/B testing functionality, a personalization suite, and more. The company serves financial, insurance, healthcare, telecommunication, education, travel, hospitality, and other industries in both B2B and B2B2C situations.

History

Toonimo was founded in 2013 by Ohad Rozen and Dan Kotlicki, who is also the CEO of the company. Their headquarters are in New York City, NY, with an additional office located in Tel Aviv, Israel. Their assistance was first used by small and midsize insurance companies and banks, who did not have enough staff to help customers. In 2017, Toonimo joined the Oracle Startup Cloud Accelerator program and got access to its worldwide network of bank, telecom and insurance companies.

Toonimo is backed by Lightspeed Venture Partners, Real Life Innovations, and several other private investors.

Leadership 
Toonimo is managed by CEO Dan Kotlicki. Other key executives are:

 Edi Buslovich (Vice President)

References

Web software
Software companies based in New York City
Software companies of the United States
2013 establishments in New York City